Cosmosoma biseriatum is a moth of the family Erebidae. It was described by William Schaus in 1898. It is found in Ecuador.

References

biseriatum
Moths described in 1898